Gorodnya may refer to:
Horodnia, a city in Chernihiv Oblast, Ukraine
Horodnia (air base), an air base in Chernihiv Oblast, Ukraine
Gorodnya River, a river in Moscow, Russia
Gorodnya, name of several rural settlements in Russia
Horodnia, Ichnia Raion, a village in Chernihiv Oblast, Ukraine